José Luis Osorio  (born 4 November 1980 in Mexico City) is a Mexican professional football player.

Club career
Osorio previously played for UNAM Pumas in the Primera División de México, making three substitute appearances during the Invierno 1999 and Verano 2000 tournaments.

International career
Osorio played for Mexico at the 1997 FIFA U-17 World Championship in Egypt.

References

1980 births
Living people
Footballers from Mexico City
Club Universidad Nacional footballers
Alianza F.C. footballers
Nejapa footballers
C.D. Chalatenango footballers
C.D. Atlético Marte footballers
Expatriate footballers in El Salvador
Mexican footballers
Association football forwards